Charles Train may refer to:

Charles J. Train (1845–1906), American admiral
Charles R. Train (1817–1885), American politician
Charles William Train (1890–1965), British soldier, recipient of the Victoria Cross